Poul is a Danish masculine given name. It is the Danish cognate of the name Paul. Poul may refer to:

People
Poul Andersen (1922–2006), Danish printer 
Poul Anderson (1926–2001), American writer
Poul Erik Andreasen (born 1949), Danish football player and manager
Poul Bang (1905–1967), Danish filmmaker
Poul Anker Bech (1942–2009), Danish painter	
Poul Bjerre (1876–1964), Swedish psychiatrist 
Poul Borum (1934–1996), Danish writer
Poul Bundgaard (1922–1998), Danish actor
Poul Simon Christiansen (1855–1933), Danish painter 
Poul Skytte Christoffersen (born 1946), Danish diplomat
Poul Elming (born 1949), Danish opera singer
Poul Glargaard (1942–2011), Danish actor
Poul Hansen (1913–1966), Danish politician
Poul Hartling (1914–2000), Danish politician and Prime Minister
Poul Heegaard (1871–1948), Danish mathematician
Poul Henningsen (1894–1967), Danish writer and architect
Poul Richard Høj Jensen (born 1944), Danish sailor
Poul Christian Holst (1776–1863), Norwegian politician
Poul Hultberg (born 1920), Danish architect
Poul Hübertz (born 1976), Danish football player
Poul Ove Jensen (born 1937), Danish architect
Poul S. Jessen, Danish-American optical physicist
Poul Jessen (1926-2015), Danish gymnast
Poul F. Joensen (1898–1970), Faroese poet
Poul Kjærholm (1929–1980), Danish designer
Poul Krebs (born 1956), Danish musician
Poul la Cour (1846–1908), Danish scientist
Poul Lange (born 1956), Danish artist
Poul Martin Møller (1794–1838), Danish writer
Poul Michelsen (born 1944), Faroese politician
Poul Müller (1909–1979), Danish actor
Poul Nesgaard (born 1952), Danish television producer
Poul Nielsen (1891–1962), Danish football player
Poul Nielson (born 1943), Danish politician
Poul Nyrup Rasmussen (born 1943), Danish politician and Prime Minister
Poul Popiel (born 1943), Danish ice hockey player
Poul H. Poulsen (1947–1999), Danish designer
Poul Reichhardt (1913–1985), Danish actor
Poul Ruders (born 1949), Danish composer
Poul Schierbeck (1888–1949), Danish composer 
Poul Schlüter (1929–2021), Danish politician and Prime Minister
Poul Christian Stemann (1764–1855), Danish politician
Poul Thomsen (1922–1988), Danish actor
Poul Erik Tøjner (born 1959), Danish museum director 
Poul Volther (1923–2001), Danish furniture designer
Poul Weber (born 1949), Danish politician

See also
Poul Creek Formation, Alaska
Paul (name)
Povl

Danish masculine given names